Qazigund, also known as Gateway Of Kashmir, is a town and in the union territory of Jammu and Kashmir, India. It has an average elevation of 1670 m (5478 feet) above mean sea level.

Qazigund Bypass passes through Dalwatch, Chimulla & Shampora  villages of Qazigund.

Qazigund is connected by NH44 & Northern Railways with rest of the Ccountry.

Demographics 
As of 2011 India census, Qazigund had a population of 9871.  Males constitute 55% of the population and females 45%. Qazigund has an average literacy rate of 70.21%, higher than the national average of 67.16%, male literacy is 79.82%, and female literacy is 58.27%. In Qazigund, 20.67% of the population is under 6 years of age.

Qazigund Byepass Is Via Dalwach, Chimulla & Shampora Villages. Qazigund is surrounded by springs, known as nags in the local language. Verinag  source of river Jhelum is only 10 km from Qazigund. Panzath Nag is just 3 km from Qazigund and famous Vasak Nag in Kund is around 12 km from Qazigund.

There are some Sufi shrines in and around Qazigund. Shrine of Baba Sa'd Shah sahab is located in shampora, Qazigund. Shrine of Baba Habib Shah Sahab and Baba Mueen Shah sahab is located in kurigram which is half kilometres from Qazigund main town, although there was not any shrine built on blessed grave of Baba Moeen Shah sahab due to spiritual restrictions put by him as per local narrations but on 23 March 2021, Maulana Hafiz Syed Zahid Hussain sahab marked some wooden structure around his blessed grave. Khanqah of Baba Naseeb-ud-Din Ghazi is located at Chowgam at a distance of 5 kilometres. Khanqah of Hazrat Shahi Hamadan Ameer e Kabeer Mir Syed Ali Hamadani (RA)is located at Dooru Shahabad at a distance of 8 kilometres from Qazigund. Shrine of Hazrat Syed Noor Shah wali Baghdadi (RA) is located at Kund approximately at a distance of 12 kilometres. Shrine of Mir Syed Hafeezullah Andrabi Qadri Naqshbandi is located in the heart of Qazigund Town inside the premises of Gousia Arabic College and a beautiful Mosque is adjacent to the Shrine.

Climate

Transport

Qazigund is connected to Anantnag and Srinagar by road and railway. There is a train service from Qazigund to Srinagar ten times a day, and is connected to Kulgam by road. Qazigund is connected to :Jammu and rest of India through NH 44 (former name NH 1A before renumbering of all national highways) that passes through Qazigund Tunnel of Pir Panjal mountain. New NH444 connects Qazigund to Srinagar via Shupiyan.

Qazigund railway tunnel

Qazigund railway tunnel or Pir Panjal Railway Tunnel, is 11 km long railway tunnel under the Pir Panjal mountains to connect Qazigund railway station to Banihal railway station. It was bored in late 2011, became operational by 26 Dec 2012 and was commissioned in June 2013. It is India's longest and Asia's third longest railway tunnel and reduced the distance between Qazigund and Banihal to only 11 km.

See also
 Chowgam
 Akingam
 Anantnag
 Banihal Qazigund Road Tunnel
 Doru Shahabad
 Fatehpora
 NH 44
 Pulwama

References 

Cities and towns in Anantnag district